Gazdanan (also Romanized as Gazdānān; also known as Gazdāneh) is a village in Poshtkuh Rural District, in the Central District of Khash County, Sistan and Baluchestan Province, Iran. At the 2006 census, its population was 47, in 9 families.

References 

Populated places in Khash County